Mega ATV Championship is a national level ATV (All terrain vehicles) racing championship in India organized by "Autosports India". It is inter college national level racing championship for engineering students basically for mechanical/ automobile branches. This championship is well known for its extraordinary racing format, night endurance racing. Till date 4 seasons held and the third season to be held in March 2020. The championship started its first season in 2015 held in Bhubaneswar.

Event format 
It is a four-day design, manufacturing, and racing competition. Where in day one the technical inspection of the vehicles to be done, and from day 2, the event starts which consists of drag race, flat dirt race, endurance race, armageddon race, black out race.

Tracks 
One Rocky Mountains track in Ahmednagar, Maharashtra situated at Dr. Vitthalrao Vikhe Patil College Of Engineering campus of length 6 Kilometers, Spread over 300 Acres.

Another track on flat dirt ground in Bhubaneswar, Odisha length 3.2 Kilometers, spread over 62 Acres.

Season-1 
Held in Bhubaneswar, Odisha, participants from many technical colleges and universities in India participated in the championship. One flat dirt track in Bhubaneswar Patia it is 3.2 Kilometers, long and on the flat ground of perfectly square shape of 600 meters x600 meters.

Season-2 
The season-2 of Mega ATV Championship received a huge response from the participants and well appreciated after end of season-1. Season-2 held at Maharashtra state in Ahmednagar District, In Dr. Vitthalrao Vikhe Patil College of engineering  campus. The track was on mountains and of a length of 6 Kilometers. The track is spread over 300 Acres of total land area.

Category Wise

Overall results

Season-3 
Mega ATV Championship season 3 was conducted in Nasik, Maharashtra in February, 2018. The event was spread over an area of whopping  210 acres with the longest track being 7 kilometres in length. It saw the participation of a hoard of enthusiastic engineering undergrads and was a successful event with some very promising winners.

Category Wise

Overall results

Season-4 
Mega ATV Championship season 4 was conducted on a plateau near Qureim beach, Goa, Maharashtra. The event was spread over a surprising 955 acres with the longest track being 9.5 kilometers in length for Endurance race. The event first time reached the maximum participation limit of 100 comprising more than 3500 engineers and attracted an overall spectators of 10,000+ strength.

Category Wise

Overall results

Season- 5 & 6 
Mega ATV Championship Season 5 & 6 was conducted on a plateau in Qureim beach, Goa, Maharashtra. The event was spread over a surprising 1000 acres with the longest track being 8.5 kilometers in length for Endurance race.

Category Wise

Overall results

External links

 http://www.dnaindia.com/locality/faridabad/btech-students- faridabad-invest- 3-months- rs-2- lakhs-
 prepare-all- terrain-vehicle- 86211
 http://www.freepressjournal.in/bhopal/engineering-students- sweat-it- out-to- build-all- terrain-
 vehicles/793390
 http://www.thehindu.com/news/national/karnataka/nitte-institute- teams-atv- wins-
 laurels/article8368594.ece
 http://www.business-standard.com/article/pti- stories/kct-wins- second-prize- in-mega- atv-
 championship-2016- 116032801207_1.html
 Mega ATV Championship
Autosports India organises a grand ATV Racing Championship - Malaysia Sun
ANI SEASON 5 & 6
Business Standard : Season 5 & 6

Auto racing series in India